Platt Adams (March 23, 1885 – February 27, 1961) was an American athlete. He competed in various events at the 1908 and 1912 Olympics and won a gold and a silver medal in jumping events in 1912.

Biography
Adams was born in Belleville, New Jersey. He had a brother, Ben Adams, also an Olympic athlete. In 1908 he finished fifth in the triple jump competition as well as in the standing high jump event. In the standing long jump competition he finished sixth. He also participated in the discus throw event and in the Greek discus contest but in both events his result is unknown.

Four years later he won the gold medal in the standing high jump and the silver medal in the standing long jump. In 1912 he also finished fifth in the triple jump competition and 23rd in the high jump event. At the same Olympics he competed in the baseball event which was held as demonstration sport.

In January 1915, the Metropolitan Association of the Amateur Athletic Union found Adams not guilty on charges of professionalism, having sold a prize or accepted cash for a medal in violation of his amateur status, in connection with a claim the Adams had traded a trophy he had received at an exhibition jump in exchange for pins.

A resident of South Orange, Adams was serving in the New Jersey General Assembly when he was named as the state's Chief Boxing Inspector in March 1923.

He died at his home in the Normandy Beach section of Toms River, New Jersey on February 27, 1961.

References

External links

1885 births
1961 deaths
American male long jumpers
American male high jumpers
American male triple jumpers
Baseball players from New Jersey
Olympic baseball players of the United States
Athletes (track and field) at the 1908 Summer Olympics
Athletes (track and field) at the 1912 Summer Olympics
Baseball players at the 1912 Summer Olympics
Olympic gold medalists for the United States in track and field
Olympic silver medalists for the United States in track and field
People from Belleville, New Jersey
People from South Orange, New Jersey
Republican Party members of the New Jersey General Assembly
Sportspeople from Essex County, New Jersey
Sportspeople from Toms River, New Jersey
Track and field athletes from New Jersey
20th-century American politicians
Medalists at the 1912 Summer Olympics
Standing high jump